Our Culture, What's Left of It: The Mandarins and the Masses is a 2005 non-fiction book by British physician and writer Theodore Dalrymple. It is composed of twenty-six separate pieces that cover a wide range of topics from drug legalisation to the influence of Shakespeare. A common theme is criticism of modern society in Great Britain and, in many articles, social attitudes towards literature. The book was published by the Ivan R. Dee group. He generally describes British culture as a "moral swamp" and writes that the people must return to past traditions before it is too late.

Contents
As a common theme, Dalrymple depicts what he sees as "the moral swamp that is contemporary Britain". He criticises current British national culture as "a banal, self-pitying, witless and shallow emotional incontinence". He advocates a restoration of what he calls traditional British virtues such as "prudence, thrift, industry, honesty, moderation, politeness, self-restraint".

He condemns the secularisation of British society, writing:

He describes his experience treating people who use illegal drugs. He defends the 'war on drugs' and attacks the arguments for legalisation. He writes, "If the war on drugs is lost, then so are the wars against theft, speeding, incest, fraud, rape, murder, arson... Few, if any such wars are winnable."

Reviews

Writer and Greek Orthodox priest Johannes L. Jacobse wrote for Orthodoxy Today that the book gives "an illuminating journey through recent cultural history". He stated that "it's rare to find such a morally coherent, historically informed, and humane account of the costs that welfare socialists impose on society". He also remarked, "Sober-minded readers will benefit from Dalrymple's work".

The Times Literary Supplement published a mostly positive review by author and editor Richard Davenport-Hines. Davenport-Hines argued that Dalrymple left out the negative influence of American culture on Britain— such as the instant gratification provided on trashy American television and the popularity of unhealthy American fast food. Richard Davenport-Hines also wrote more generally that:

A supportive review appeared in News Weekly, a publication by the Australian public policy group National Civic Council. The news magazine stated that "It is rare for a book on social issues to be so readable, but this is not a work of abstract social theory." The review also stated that "The vividness of Dalrymple's prose and the remorseless logic of his arguments make this a formidable work. Anyone concerned about the fate of Western civilisation should read this book."

See also

2005 in literature
Spoilt Rotten: The Toxic Cult of Sentimentality
Life at the Bottom: The Worldview That Makes the Underclass

References

2005 non-fiction books
Essay collections
English non-fiction books
Books by Theodore Dalrymple